"Un giorno mi dirai" (English: One day you will tell me) is a song recorded by the Italian band Stadio. Written by the band's frontman Gaetano Curreri along with Saverio Grandi and Luca Chiaravalli, the song was released as a single from their fifteenth studio album Miss nostalgia on 10 February 2016. The song enjoyed commercial success in Italy after winning the Sanremo Music Festival 2016, peaking at third place on the FIMI Singles Chart.

Track listing

Charts

Certifications

References

2016 singles
2016 songs
Sanremo Music Festival songs
Universal Music Group singles
Stadio songs